St Ives School is a coeducational secondary school with academy status, located in St Ives, Cornwall, England.

Barbara Hepworth 
Notable sculptor Barbara Hepworth donated a copy of her 1965 work Oval Form (one of a limited edition of nine, about six inches across) for use as a prize.

References

External links 
 

Secondary schools in Cornwall
Buildings and structures in St Ives, Cornwall
Academies in Cornwall